Events in the year 1994 in the European Union.

Incumbents 
 President of the European Council –  Andreas Papandreou (Jan – Jun 1994),  Helmut Kohl (July – Dec 1994)
 Commission President –  Jacques Delors 
 Council Presidency –  Greece (Jan – Jun 1994),  Germany (July – Dec 1994)

Events

January 
 1 January 
 Greece takes over the Presidency of the Council of the European Union. 
 Stage II of economic and monetary union begins, with the establishment of the European Monetary Institute (EMI). 
 The agreement establishing the European Economic Area (EEA) enters into force.

February 
 19 February – The court of Auditors publishes the special report concerning controls of irregularities and fraud in the agricultural area.

March
 9–10 March – The Committee of the Regions, set up by the Treaty of the European Union, holds its inaugural session. Jacques Blanc is elected chairman. 
 29 March – An informal meeting of foreign ministers is held in Ioannina. A compromise decision is adopted on rules for qualified-majority decision-making in preparation for enlargement. 
 30 March – Accession negotiations with Austria, Sweden, Finland and Norway conclude in Brussels. 
 31 March – Hungary formally applies to join the European Union.

April
 5 April – Poland formally applies to join the European Union.
 6 April – The Commission adopts a Green Paper on the Union's audiovisual policy. 
 15 April – The final act of the Uruguay round (GATT) negotiations is signed in Marrakech, Morocco. 
 19 April – The Council decides on joint action under common foreign and security policy in support of the Middle East peace process. 
 26 April – The Parliament and the Council adopt the fourth framework programme on research, development and demonstration (1994-1998).

May
 25 May – The board of governors of the European Investment Bank establishes the European Investment Fund. 
 26–27 May – An inaugural conference for a Stability Pact for central and eastern Europe is held in Paris, France.

June
 9–12 June – Direct elections to the European Parliament are held for the fourth time. 
 12 June – A referendum is held in Austria, the majority is in favour of accession to the European Union.
 14 June – A partnership and cooperation agreement between the European Union and Ukraine is signed in Luxembourg.
 24–25 June – A European Council is held in Corfu, Greece. It mainly discusses growth, competitiveness and employment. The Acts of Accession of Austria, Sweden, Finland and Norway are signed. A new partnership and cooperation agreement between the European Communities, the Member States and Russia is signed.

July
 1 July – Germany takes over the Presidency of the Council of the European Union.
 8–10 July – The 20th Western Economic Summit is held in Naples, Italy. 
 14 July – Faccini Dori ruling. The European Court of Justice affirms that a Member State injuring a private individual by omitting to transpose a directive in its national law must pay compensation provided that certain conditions are satisfied.
 15 July – An extraordinary meeting of the European Council is held in Brussels: Jacques Santer is chosen to succeed Jacques Delors as President of the European Commission. 
 18 July – Free trade agreements are signed in Brussels, with Estonia, Latvia and Lithuania. 
 19–26 July – The new European Parliament holds its first part-session in Strasbourg. Klaus Hänsch is elected president. Jacques Santer is formally appointed as next President of the European Commission. 
 27 July – The Commission adopts a White Paper on the European Social policy.

October
 10 October – A cooperation agreement between the Community and South Africa is signed. A conference on Security and Cooperation in Europe (CSCE) opens in Budapest, Hungary. 
 16 October – A referendum is held in Finland, the majority is in favour of accession to the European Union. 
 25 October – The Commission adopts the first part of the Green Paper on liberalisation of telecommunications infrastructure and cable television networks.

November
 13 November – A referendum is held in Sweden, the majority is in favour of accession to the European Union. 
 15 November – The European Monetary Institute Council meets for the first time in Frankfurt. 
 28 November – The Norwegian referendum rejects accession to the European Union. 
 29 November – The Parliament, the Council and the Commission adopt the financial perspective 1995-99 adjusted to take account of enlargement. 
 30 November – The Council adopts a first joint action in the field of Justice and Home Affairs.

December
 6 December – The Council adopts the Leonardo da Vinci programme in vocational training and passes its first resolution under the Social Policy Protocol. 
 9–10 December – The European Council in Essen, Germany lays down lines of action for growth, competitiveness and employment with special reference to measures to combat unemployment and to bring trans-European networks into operation; it agrees on an overall strategy to bring the associated countries of Central and Eastern Europe closer to the Community and reiterates its determination to establish a Euro-Mediterranean partnership. It approves the principle of a multi-annual aid programme for Northern Ireland. 
 15–16 December – The Council adopts a conclusion on the Community strategy for reducing CO2 emissions and on environment and transport. It also adopts a regulation on the substances which deplete the ozone layer and a directive on the incineration of hazardous waste. 
 17 December – The European Energy Charter is signed in Lisbon.

European Capitals of Culture
The European Capital of Culture is a city designated by the European Union for a period of one calendar year, during which it organises a series of cultural events with a strong European dimension. 
  Lisbon, Portugal

See also
 History of the European Union
 Timeline of European Union history

References

External links

 
Years of the 20th century in the European Union
1990s in the European Union